Dr. Jennifer Crocker is a professor and Ohio Eminent Scholar in Social Psychology at Ohio State University. She is also a former president of the Society for Personality and Social Psychology. Her publications are on the subject of self-esteem and the contingencies and interpersonal goals that individuals have that are a clear reflection of their level of self-esteem.

Career 
She received her BA in psychology  from Michigan State University,  and   her Ph.D. in Psychology and Social Relations from Harvard University in 1979 with a thesis on "Schemas, hypothesis-testing, and intuitive assessments of covariation"       She was subsequently assistant professor of psychology at Northwestern University(1979-1985),    Professor at the University of Buffalo (1985-1995), Research Professor at the Institute for Social Research   and   Claude Steele Collegiate Professor of psychology at the University of Michigan (1995-2010). She came to Ohio State in June 2010.

Awards
She is a Fellow of the American Psychological Association, the American Psychological Society, the  Society for Personality and Social Psychology, and the   Society for the Psychological Study of Social Issues. She is President-elect of the Society for Personality and Social Psychology, and has received the Lifetime Career Award from the International Society for Self and Identity. She was American Academy of Arts and Sciences Fellow of 2019.

Research
Crocker studies self-esteem, contingencies of self-worth, and the costs of pursuing self-esteem. She also emphasizes interpersonal goals that are often involved in relationships.

Self-esteem and self-worth
Crocker is particularly notable for her research on contingencies of self-worth or contingent self-esteem. She created a scale called the Contingencies of Self-Worth Scale. This scale, made up of 65 items, evaluates these contingencies of self-worth and places them in two major categories. She argues that contingencies of self-worth are domains in which self-worth was either externally or internally validated. Contingencies that were considered externally validated included domains such as appearance, competition, and the approval of others. Contingencies that were considered internally validated were family support, virtue, and religious faith. Crocker surmised that it was these contingencies that defined a person's perception of their own self-worth. Because of this emphasis on contingency, level of self-esteem was no longer the issue of concern. Rather, where a person decides to stake his/her self-worth will influence his/her behavior, and depending on where the validation is placed, this behavior could either have costs or benefits. Furthermore, Crocker has studied the effects of contingent self-worth on psychological vulnerability and negative behavior. She is especially interested in how people search for self-esteem by pursuing success in certain areas of life, and how this search affects other human needs such as learning, relationships, self-regulation, and mental and physical health. Crocker has also studied how these variables of self-esteem relate to a person's ability to receive criticism. Through this line of research, she has gone on to research how self-worth defines a person's goals and the kind of motivation that in turn allows for a person to achieve these goals. Crocker acknowledges the benefits of pursuing self-esteem, but her research focuses mainly on the costs because she believes people are often oblivious to the negative effects. She believes that an optimal level of self-esteem may only be achieved in the complete eradication, or absence of, the pursuit itself. Crocker further stipulates that anyone who forms goals based on their own inner values, without any external validation, possesses the kind of motivation that will successfully drive them to achieve these goals, without any costs to the self.

Crocker's research also includes applications for her hypothesis on self-esteem and contingencies of self-worth. This research addresses depressive symptoms and alcohol use in college students and the correlation (if any) between the negative behavior and one's self-esteem. The first application is a study on depression in which first-year college students were given assessments during new student orientation and then again during second semester. This study showed that students who pursued self-esteem based on external contingencies (appearance, competition, and the approval of others) showed a significantly higher probability of developing symptoms of depression. According to the research found in this study, low self-esteem is most likely not the cause, but yet a very important symptom relating to the depressive symptoms of college freshmen. A second application of self-esteem gave promising results to pursuing self-esteem, although most of Crocker's research emphasizes the costs to pursuit of self-esteem. Crocker's study of the alcohol use of students uncovered that low self-esteem is not a predictor of alcohol use, but contingencies of self-worth correlated with internal validation (family support, virtue, and religious faith) did predict drinking behavior This shows that some of the contingencies common with the pursuit of self-esteem influence drinking, but levels of self-esteem itself does not. More recently, her research has looked into egosystem and ecosystem goals and their effects on goal achievement, support, responsiveness, and mental health including stress, anxiety, and depression. Egosystem goals are when people only focus on their own needs and desires and ecosystem goals are when people realize they have a connection with others. Crocker found that having an ecosystem could improve relations between different groups. Intergroup relationships are challenging because of the different social identities, but having ecosystem goals can greatly improve these relations. Egosystem goals can cause destructive interactions, while ecosystem goals can create positive relations because they support, understand, and care for them and have better communication skills. Her current research seeks to examine how interpersonal goals shape physiological processes and how they affect other people. She is also studying the effects of interpersonal goals for cross-race relationships.

Interpersonal goals 
In recognizing the importance of self-image, Crocker has dedicated a great majority of her research to this idea as it relates to interpersonal goals, which are goals meant to attain, maintain, or avoid a specific end state for the partner or the relationship, such as to help the partner, maintain closeness, or avoid rejection. She relates this to the self by classifying interpersonal goals according to two different outlooks. Those who adopt a narrowly self-interested egosystem perspective tend to prioritize their own needs and desires even at the expense of others. Other people are only deemed to be important if they are able to potentially satisfy or stand in the way of one's own needs and desires. In this perspective, people have what she calls self-image goals. Crocker suggests this perspective causes people to be concerned with the impressions others hold of them. Job interviews, college applications, and the initial stages of a relationship require people to convey an accurate yet glorified conception of self because they want to be seen as having desirable qualities when engaging with others. People with self-image goals are only concerned with others because they withhold the ability to give approval, inclusion, and validation. Her research emphasizes the cost of self-image goals because they lead people to feel competitive, fearful, confused, depressed, and anxious. In contrast, when people have a broader ecosystem perspective, they tend to give priority to the needs of the self and others. Other people are important because the well-being of one person may indirectly affect the well-being of all in a biological ecosystem. People who have an ecosystem perspective have what Crocker calls compassionate goals. These individuals are equally concerned with the well-being of others and see their own needs and desires as a part of a greater system. An individual's need to belong can be satisfied by being in close relation with others. When people shift their focus to be supportive of close others rather than focus on the image others have of them, they are more responsive. People are more responsive when they have compassionate goals because these goals are motivated by a genuine concern for the well-being of others. As a result, the increase in responsiveness increases others' regard and the individual's own self-esteem. An increase in responsiveness enables people to make a difference in others' lives, which in return increases their self-esteem and relational value.

Notable publications

Publications
Her most widely cited publication "Social stigma and self-esteem: The self-protective properties of stigma.", published when she was at the University of Buffalo, has been cited 3378 times   Her second most cited paper, A collective self-esteem scale: Self-evaluation of one's social identity  has been cited 1721 times.  In all, she has published 38  papers with over 100 citations in Google Scholar.

References

External links 
 

Year of birth missing (living people)
Living people
American social psychologists
Ohio State University faculty
Michigan State University alumni
Harvard Graduate School of Arts and Sciences alumni
University of Michigan faculty
University at Buffalo faculty